This article lists the results for the sport of Squash in 2013.

2013 PSA World Series
 Tournament of Champions (18–24 January):  Ramy Ashour defeated  Grégory Gaultier 7–11, 6–11, 12–10, 11–3, 11–1.
 North American Open (25 February – 2 March):  Ramy Ashour defeated  Nick Matthew 11–7, 11–8, 5–11, 11–7.
 Kuwait PSA Cup (8–14 March):  Ramy Ashour defeated  James Willstrop 6–11, 11–8, 11–3, 11–3.
 British Open (20–26 May):  Ramy Ashour defeated  Grégory Gaultier 7–11, 11–4, 11–7, 11–8.
 US Open (11–18 October):  Grégory Gaultier defeated  Nick Matthew 11–4, 11–5, 11–5.
 Qatar Classic (10–15 November):  Mohamed El Shorbagy defeated  Nick Matthew 11–5, 5–11, 11–6, 6–11, 11–4.
 Hong Kong Open (3–8 December):  Nick Matthew defeated  Borja Golán 11–1, 11-8, 5-11, 11-5.

PSA World Championship
 PSA World Championship (26 October - 3 November):  Nick Matthew defeated  Grégory Gaultier 11-9, 11-9, 11-13, 7-11, 11-2.

2013 WSA World Series
 Kuala Lumpur Open (27–31 March):  Laura Massaro defeated  Alison Waters 11–9, 11–7, 11–6.
 British Open (21–26 May):  Laura Massaro defeated  Nicol David 11–4, 3–11, 12–10, 11–8.
 Malaysian Open (12–15 September):  Nicol David defeated  Raneem El Weleily 13–11, 11–13, 7–11, 11–8, 11–5.
 US Open (13–18 October):  Nicol David defeated  Laura Massaro 11–8, 11–7, 11–6.
 Hong Kong Open (4–8 December):  Nicol David defeated  Raneem El Weleily 11–7, 11–7, 12-10.

WSF World Team Championships
 Men's World Team Championships 
   England,   Egypt,   France

External links
 World Squash: official website of the World Squash Federation

 
Squash by year